The Republic of China (Taiwan) competed at the 1956 Summer Olympics in Melbourne, Australia. Twenty competitors, all men, took part in thirteen events in five sports.

Athletics 

 Yang Chuan-Kwang

Basketball

Squad
 Chen Tsu-Li
 Chien Kok-Ching
 Hoo Cha-Pen
 James Yap
 Lai Lam-Kwong
 Ling Jing-Huan
 Loo Hor-Kuay
 Tong Suet-Fong
 Wang Yih-Jiun
 Willie Chu
 Wu Yet-An
 Yung Pi-Hock

Boxing

Shooting

One shooter represented the Republic of China in 1956.

300 m rifle, three positions
 Wu Tao-yan

50 m rifle, three positions
 Wu Tao-yan

50 m rifle, prone
 Wu Tao-yan

Weightlifting

Notes

References

External links
Official Olympic Reports

Nations at the 1956 Summer Olympics
1956
1956 in Taiwanese sport